HMS Danae was an  sloop of the Royal Navy, built at the Portsmouth Dockyard and launched on 21 May 1867.

During 1867, she commissioned on the Cape and West Africa Station and served until being transferred to the North America and West Indies Station in 1869. Danae was refitted and rearmed in 1874 in England. After refit she commissioned for the East Indies Station, then later the Cape Station and finally she commenced service on the Australia Station in September 1878. She left the Australia Station in August 1880 and returned to England.

After returning home in 1881, she was declared unfit due to rotten upper planking and was paid off. She was converted into a mine hulk in 1886, before being lent to the War Department in 1891. Danae was stationed on the River Mersey until 1905.

Fate
She was sold on 15 May 1906 for breaking up.

Notes

Notes

Bibliography

Bastock, John (1988), Ships on the Australia Station, Child & Associates Publishing; Frenchs Forest, Australia. 

 

 

1867 ships
Ships built in Portsmouth
Eclipse-class sloops
Victorian-era sloops of the United Kingdom